Rhys ap Tudur (died 1412) was a Welsh nobleman and a member of the Tudor family of Penmynydd. He held positions of power on behalf of King Richard II of England, including two periods as the Sheriff of Anglesey in the 1370s and 80s. Rhys accompanied the king on a military expedition to Ireland in 1398, but in 1400 began to support the revolt of his cousin Owain Glyndŵr against King Henry IV of England. In 1401, he and his brother Gwilym ap Tudur took Conwy Castle after infiltrating it, and liaised with Henry Percy prior to his own rebellion in 1403. After being outlawed by the king in 1406, Rhys was captured and executed at Chester in 1412, although later oral tradition claims he returned to Anglesey to die there.

Ancestry and early life
Rhys was one of five sons of Tudur ap Goronwy and Marged ferch Tomos; alongside Ednyfed ap Tudor, Maredudd ap Tudur, Goronwy ap Tudor and Gwilym ap Tudur. Tudur had served with the forces of King Edward III of England during the campaigns in France in 1337, assuming the rank of knight in the process. Afterwards, he became a royal officer for the island of Anglesey and ensured that all of his sons found similar roles. The family were descended from Ednyfed Fychan, and his son Goronwy ab Ednyfed, the founder of the Tudor family of Penmynydd.

Service to the crown
Rhys and his brother Goronwy were rhaglaws (bailiffs) for the commote of Dindaethwy across three decades; from the 1370s through to the 1390s. He was made Sheriff of Anglesey twice, first between 1374–75 and again in 1381–84. This was a post more typically held by an Englishman at the time. In 1386, Rhys was one of the leaders of a contingent of soldiers raised in Caernarfonshire to protect against a potential invasion by the French. King Richard II of England paid Rhys £10 a year to retain his service should the crown require it, and accompanied him on a military expedition to Ireland in 1398.

However, that same year Rhys was summoned before the king's justicar of North Wales to explain why he had managed to become indebted to the sum of £60 in his role of rhaglaw at Dindaethwy. Rhys held lands in Anglesey and Caernarfonshire which he inherited from his father, and these would have provided a steady income.

Revolt
In September 1399, King Richard II was overthrown by Henry IV. When Rhys' cousin Owain Glyndŵr began a rebellion the following year, he and his brothers publicly backed him. While Owain's rebellion in North East Wales faltered, Rhys and his family rose up against the king on Anglesey. Henry IV personally took an army to put down the revolt, and harried the island, burning the Franciscan Llanfaes Friary near Bangor, Gwynedd, where the Tudur family were buried. Rhys led troops to ambush them from an advantageous spot on Rhos Fawr. When he engaged Henry's troops, the English fled to the safety of Beaumaris Castle.

When Henry issued a general pardon for those of North Wales in March 1401, he purposely excluded Rhys, his brother Gwilym and Owain Glyndŵr. As a result, Rhys and Gwilym hatched an audacious plan. On Good Friday, 1 April 1401, the brothers and 44 men infiltrated Conway Castle. They pretended to be carpenters, and entered the castle while the guard were in church, capturing it. Negotiations began for the return of the castle on 13 April, with the king represented by Henry "Hotspur" Percy. After seeking a compromise, which would have resulted in pardons being given to the Welshmen, the king overrode Percy's decision on 20 April. An agreement was finally reached on 24 June after several failed attempts when Gwilym began writing to the king directly.

Percy subsequently liaised with Rhys in preparation for his own rebellion against the king on 1403, which started and ended with the Battle of Shrewsbury where Percy was killed by the king's forces. All three Tudur brothers were outlawed by the king in 1406. The constable of Welshpool Council arrested several rebel leaders, including Rhys and transported him to Chester. Documents from the era show that Rhys was executed there in 1412.

Legacy
After the execution of Rhys, his brother Gwilym was given a full pardon a year later. Both their lands had been forfeited when they joined with Owain's rebellion and passed to Gwilym ap Gruffydd, who had married Morfudd, the daughter of Goronwy ap Tudur. Rhys' death was later lamented in a poem by Gruffydd Gryg.

Lineage

Notes

References

1412 deaths
Welsh rebels
Year of birth unknown
Executed Welsh people
15th-century executions by England
High Sheriffs of Anglesey